Piaskowo may refer to the following places:
Piaskowo, Gmina Szamotuły in Greater Poland Voivodeship (west-central Poland)
Piaskowo, Gmina Ostroróg in Greater Poland Voivodeship (west-central Poland)
Piaskowo, Pomeranian Voivodeship (north Poland)
Piaskowo, Gryfino County in West Pomeranian Voivodeship (north-west Poland)
Piaskowo, Koszalin County in West Pomeranian Voivodeship (north-west Poland)